Orienthella trilineata, common name three-lined aeolid, is a species of sea slug, an aeolid nudibranch, a marine heterobranch mollusc in the family Flabellinidae.

Distribution
This species was described from Nanoose Bay, Regional District of Nanaimo, Vancouver Island, British Columbia, Canada. Orienthella trilineata is a seasonally abundant aeolid ranging from Baja California, Mexico to Alaska.

Diet
This species feeds on hydroids, especially Tubularia spp. and Eudendrium californicum.

Description
Orienthella trilineata is a flabellinid nudibranch with a translucent body and three longitudinal white lines on the back and sides. The line down the middle of the back passes between the rhinophores where it splits and continues to the tips of the oral tentacles. The rhinophores are perfoliate and coloured white at the base but orange in the outer third. The digestive gland is either red or orange in colour. Maximum length is about 35mm.

References

Flabellinidae
Gastropods described in 1921